The International Actuarial Association (IAA) is a worldwide association of local professional actuarial associations.

History 
The IAA is the continuation of the Comité Permanent des Congrès d’Actuaires, established in 1895, as an association of individuals. It was renamed the IAA in 1968. At the 26th International Congress of Actuaries, held in Birmingham on 7–12 June 1998, the General Assembly of the International Actuarial Association restructured itself.

The restructure created a single unified framework to ensure unity of direction and efficient coordination with respect to issues of a worldwide nature. The major responsibilities of the IAA are now in the hands of the actuarial associations, which bring together the actuaries in their respective countries and is the link between the actuaries and the actuarial associations worldwide. The IAA is the unique international organization dedicated to the research, education and development of the profession and of actuarial associations.

Sections 
The IAA has six sections, AFIR-ERM, ASTIN, IAAHS, IAALS, IACA, PBSS.

Actuarial Approach for Financial Risks 
The Actuarial Approach for Financial Risks (AFIR-ERM) section and was founded in 1988. It has as its objective the promotion of actuarial research in financial risks and enterprise risk management, and its most important function is the organizing of annual colloquia.

Actuarial Studies In Non-Life Insurance 
The Actuarial Studies In Non-life insurance (ASTIN) section was founded in 1957. ASTIN organises annual colloquia and jointly publishes with the other sections, the ASTIN Bulletin, an internationally renowned referenced scientific journal.

International Actuarial Association Health Section 
The International Actuarial Association Health Section (IAAHS) was founded in 2003 to provide an international perspective on health actuarial practice, public and private health insurance, and health policy matters.

International Actuarial Association Life Section 
The International Actuarial Association Life Section (IAALS) has as its objectives to promote and facilitate an international exchange of views, advice, research and practical information among actuaries involved with life insurance issues.

International Association of Consulting Actuaries 
The International Association of Consulting Actuaries (IACA) is the consulting section of the IAA.

The IACA first met in 1960, and was formally constituted in 1968. It held international meetings every other year to consider issues of concern to consulting actuaries. Much of the impetus for early meetings was stimulated by Max Lander and Geoffrey Heywood, who continued to play a prominent role in the Association for many years and were elected Emeritus Members of its Committee in 1976.

In 1999, following a restructuring of the IAA, the IACA was admitted as the consulting section of the IAA.

Pensions, Benefits and Social Security 
The Pensions, Benefits, Social Security Section (PBSS) was founded in 2003 to serve actuaries around the world who have personal, professional, educational or research interests in social protection and the commercial, social and public policy issues concerning the provision of pensions and other benefits.

Governance 
The IAA Council comprises the President whose term of office is one year, the officers and one delegate per full member association and one delegate per section. The committees and the council normally meet twice a year in different countries.

The Officers for the period January 1, 2022 to December 31, 2022 are:

 Micheline Dionne, President
 Charles Cowling, President-Elect
 Roseanne Harris, Immediate Past President

The Council elects an Executive Committee to coordinate activities and operations, and propose strategies, budgets, membership fees and Council meeting venues. The President chairs the Executive Committee, which comprises the Officers and the chairpersons of the Committees and Sections.

Member associations 
Currently, the IAA has 74 full member associations, 26 associate member associations, six partners organisations and 4 patrons. All individual actuaries can elect to join any section of the IAA, which currently are ASTIN, AFIR-ERM, IACA, IAAHS, IAALS and PBSS by paying the required contribution.

Full members 
 Caribbean Actuarial Association
 Central American Actuaries Association
 Professional Council of Economic Sciences of the City of Buenos Aires
 Actuaries Institute Australia
 Austrian Actuarial Society
 Institute of Actuaries in Belgium
 Actuarial Association in Bosnia and Herzegovina
 Brazilian Institute of Actuaries
 Bulgarian Actuarial Society
 Canadian Institute of Actuaries
 China Association of Actuaries
 Colombian Association of Actuaries
 Croatian Actuarial Association
 Cyprus Association of Actuaries
 Czech Society of Actuaries
 Danish Society of Actuaries
 Egyptian Society of Actuaries
 Estonian Actuarial Society
 Actuarial Society of Finland
 Institute of Actuaries of France
 German Actuarial Society
 Actuarial Society of Ghana
 Hellenic Actuarial Society (Greece)
 Actuarial Society of Hong Kong
 Hungarian Actuarial Society
 Society of Icelandic Actuaries
 Institute of Actuaries of India
 Society of Actuaries of Indonesia
 Society of Actuaries in Ireland
 Israel Association of Actuaries
 Italian Institute of Actuaries
 Institute of Actuaries of Ivory Coast
 Institute of Actuaries of Japan
 Japanese Society of Certified Pension Actuaries
 Actuarial Society of Kazakhstan
 Actuarial Society of Kenya
 Latvian Actuarial Association
 Lebanese Association of Actuaries
 Lithuanian Actuarial Society
 Macedonian Actuarial Association
 Actuarial Society of Malaysia
 National Association of Actuaries (Mexico)
 Moroccan Association of Actuaries
 Actuarial Society of the Netherlands
 New Zealand Society of Actuaries
 Nigerian Actuarial Society
 Norwegian Society of Actuaries
 Pakistan Society of Actuaries
 Actuarial Society of the Philippines
 Polish Society of Actuaries
 Portuguese Institute of Actuaries
 Romanian Actuarial Association
 Russian Guild of Actuaries
 Serbian Association of Actuaries
 Singapore Actuarial Society
 Slovak Society of Actuaries
 Slovenian Association of Actuaries
 Actuarial Society of South Africa
 Institute of Actuaries of Korea (South Korea)
 Spanish Institute of Actuaries
 Catalan Actuarial Association (Spain)
 Actuarial Association of Sri Lanka
 Swedish Society of Actuaries
 Swiss Association of Actuaries
 Actuarial Institute of Chinese Taipei 
 Society of Actuaries of Thailand
 Actuarial Society of Turkey
 Association of Consulting Actuaries (United Kingdom)
 Institute and Faculty of Actuaries (United Kingdom)
 American Society of Pension Professionals and Actuaries
 Casualty Actuarial Society (United States)
 Conference of Consulting Actuaries (United States)
 Society of Actuaries (United States)

Associate members 
 Albanian Actuarial Association 
 Institute of Actuaries of Argentina
 Actuarial Society of Armenia 
 Actuarial Association of Azerbaijan
 Actuarial Association of the Republic of Srpska (Bosnia and Herzegovina) 
 Channel Islands Actuarial Society
 Institute of Actuaries of Chile
 Ecuadorian Actuarial Association
 Association of Actuaries and Financial Analysts (Georgia)
 Actuarial Society of Iran 
 Luxembourg Actuarial Association
 Mexican Association of Actuaries
 Moldovan Actuarial Association
 Society of Actuaries of Mongolia
 Society of Actuaries of Namibia 
 Association of Actuaries of Panama
 Association of Professional Actuaries (Russia)
 Institut National des Actuaires au Sénégal (Senegal) 
 Actuarial Society of Tanzania
 Association Actuarielle au Togo 
 The Actuarial Association of Uganda 
 Society of Actuaries of Ukraine
 Actuarial Society of Zambia 
 Actuarial Society of Zimbabwe

Partners 
 International Accounting Standards Board
 International Association of Insurance Supervisors
 International Organisation of Pension Supervisors
 International Social Security Association
 Organisation for Economic Co-operation and Development
 Sustainable Insurance Forum

Observers 
None

Patrons 
 Reinsurance Group of America
 Milliman
 Istituto Nazionale per l'Assicurazione contro gli Infortuni sul Lavoro e le malattie professionali

Publications 
 ASTIN Bulletin - The Journal of the International Actuarial Association
 Stochastic Modeling – Theory and Reality from an Actuarial Perspective
 Discount Rates in Financial Reporting A Practical Guide
 Risk Adjustments for Insurance Contracts Under IFRS 17

Past presidents 
 1895-1896 - Léon Mahillon
 1896-1909 - Omer Lepreux
 1909-1946 - Amédée Bégault
 1946-1950 - Léon François
 1950-1964 - Albert Théate
 1964-1984 - Edouard Franckx
 1987-1988 - Henri Rijkers
 1988-1998 - André Lamens
 1995-1996 - Paul McCrossan†
 1996-1997 - Christopher Daykin†
 1997-1998 - Walter S. Rugland†
 1998-1999 - Jean Berthon
 2000 - Catherine M. Prime
 2001 - Morris W. Chambers
 2002 - Edward J. Levay
 2003 - W. James MacGinnitie
 2004 - Luis Huerta
 2005 - Alf Guldberg
 2006 - Jean-Louis Massé
 2007 - Hillevi Mannonen
 2008 - David G. Hartman
 2009 - Katsumi Hikasa
 2010 - Paul N. Thornton
 2011 - Cecil D. Bykerk
 2012 - Desmond K. Smith
 2013 - Kurt Wolfsdorf
 2014 - Robert L. Brown
 2015 - Frederick Rowley
 2016 - Malcolm Campbell
 2017 - Thomas S. Terry
 2018 - Masaaki Yoshimura
 2019 - Gábor Hanák
 2020 - Tonya B. Manning
 2021 - Jan Kars
 2022 - Roseanne Harris
†Chairmen of the International Forum of Actuarial Associations

Medallists of the IAA 
 2001 - Hans Bühlmann
 2001 - Max Lacroix
 2008 - Paul McCrossan
 2010 - Yves Guérard
 2014 - Christopher Daykin

References

External links
 International Actuarial Association official website

Actuarial associations